Flat IP architecture provides a way to identify devices using symbolic names, unlike the hierarchical architecture such as that used in "normal" IP addresses. This form of system is of more interest to mobile broadband network operators.

Flat IP architecture
To meet customer demand for real-time data applications delivered over mobile broadband networks, wireless operators are turning to flat IP network architectures.

The key benefits of flat IP architectures are
lower costs
reduced system latency
decoupled radio access and core network evolution

Key players in recognizing these advantages are
Mobile Networks
3rd Generation Partnership Project (3GPP)
3GPP2 standards organizations
WiMAX Forum.

Key considerations of Flat IP Architectures for Mobile Networks include
Advanced base stations that integrate radio control, header compression, encryption, call admission control, and policy enforcement with IP/Ethernet interfaces.
Base station routers will provide simpler, lower-latency 3GPP/2 networks. Key emerging players are: Alcatel-Lucent, Airvana, and Ubiquisys.

For WCDMA networks, the Direct Tunnel Architecture is emerging as the most viable evolution path. Currently, all major vendors support Direct Tunnel, where the SGSN is bypassed on the user plane. Even further advancement is Nokia-Siemens's Internet High-Speed Packet Access ([IHSPA]) architecture which also removes the RNC from the data path, thereby simplifying the architecture and reducing latencies even further.

The WiMax Access Services Network was the first standardized IP-centric mobile network architecture establishing principles now being adopted across the industry.  Eventually, HSPA and LTE networks have been chosen by most operators as their preferred network technology.

See also

 3GPP Long Term Evolution
 All IP

References

External links
TcpIpGuide
ElectroSmart
Alcatel Lucent
iPhone IMEI Checker
3GPP TR 25.999
Ubiquisys
Airvana
Ericsson

Mobile telecommunications standards
3GPP standards